Beavis is a fictional character who serves as one of two protagonists from the MTV/Paramount+ animated series Beavis and Butt-Head. He is voiced by the show's creator, Mike Judge. In the movie Beavis and Butt-Head Do the Universe, Beavis' mother is referred to as "Shirley Beavis", meaning that Beavis is actually the character's last name. His father is a former Mötley Crüe roadie along with Butt-Head’s father.

Beavis has blond hair which he wears in an oversized pompadour style, a pronounced underbite, and an obsessive stare and speaks in a hoarse voice along with his trademark snicker ("Heh heh"). He is nearly always seen in profile, rather than looking directly at the camera. He is usually seen wearing a Metallica T-shirt, though in merchandising appearances his shirt displays the slogan "Death Rock" to avoid licensing issues. In the episode "Give Blood", he wears a Slayer shirt, while in the Christmas special "It's a Miserable Life" Beavis is seen wearing a Winger shirt during the alternate reality section of the episode. In the 2022 revival, Beavis' older self wears a dark gray T-shirt and jeans.

He is slightly shorter than his best friend Butt-Head, although he appears taller from a distance due to his hairstyle. Beavis works with Butt-Head as a fry cook at the (fictional) fast food restaurant Burger World and once defiantly revealed that he is a fan of the rock band Bon Jovi to Butt-Head, who dislikes the band and its lead singer Jon Bon Jovi.

Beavis's name was inspired by a friend of Judge's from his college days named Bobby Beavis.

Personality
Dan Tobin of The Boston Phoenix described Beavis as "the sidekick and follower" who developed into "more of a loose cannon".

Mike Judge once said in an interview that Beavis "is a zero" when it comes to intelligence; indeed, Beavis is often oblivious to what should be obvious. Generally subordinate to Butt-Head and willing to tolerate a large amount of physical and verbal abuse, Beavis nonetheless has limits. In "Murder Site", Beavis was driven to attack and nearly kill Butt-Head, who ceaselessly called him "Butt-Knocker", a term which Beavis resents. Beavis also stood up to Butt-Head while they were watching the video for Rancid's "Nihilism": Butt-Head kept talking about it derisively, prompting Beavis to tell Butt-Head to shut up. When Butt-Head reacted with fury, ordering Beavis never again to tell him to shut up and threatening to attack him, Beavis preemptively kicked Butt-Head in the testicles, told him to shut up again, and walked out of the room to get something to eat. In another episode, while the duo were watching a Bon Jovi video, Beavis claimed to like one part of the song, causing Butt-Head to slap him in disgust. After being struck a few times, Beavis kicked Butt-Head in the groin and proclaimed "Bon Jovi rules!".

In spite of his overt idiocy, Beavis possesses a number of character strengths. Though usually shown to be the (slightly) less intelligent of the two, he can be inadvertently witty and, when discussing subjects that neither he nor Butt-Head understand, he is more likely to guess the actual mechanisms at work. Also, on the rare occasion that a female exhibits interest in one of the duo, it is usually Beavis who gets the attention. This could be because of Beavis's somewhat childlike temperament, which is less off-putting than Butt-Head's crasser, more blatantly sexual approaches. For example, when the two encounter members of the opposite sex, Butt-Head will typically lead off with a smug opening line such as "Hey, baby", which invariably flops; Beavis, on the other hand, will usually approach the woman with a less obvious "Hi!" or "Hey, how's it going?". Easily influenced by Butt-Head, however, Beavis will often imitate his buddy's cruder pick-up lines. Beavis has also shown instances of insight on such topics as the true meaning of Christmas, or in his analysis of a video by Korn. However, in both instances Beavis seems to be either in a trance or possessed, and shortly afterward he displays no recollection of what he just said.

Recklessness
Beavis has a more volatile, unpredictable nature. His hasty actions usually end in disaster, ranging from being deported to Mexico to severely injuring himself and occasional arrest for crimes such as trespassing. In some early episodes, Beavis displays signs of being a pyromaniac. Though his obsession with fire remained an obvious trait, as the seasons progressed and network censorship pressures increased, his fixation became more of a passing gag. In a deleted scene from the 1996 film, Beavis steals the Declaration of Independence to use as toilet paper.

Cornholio

Cornholio is an alter ego of Beavis. Though the Cornholio character was developed in the episode "The Great Cornholio", Beavis first plays the entity as a passing gag in "Generation in Crisis". Beavis sometimes undergoes a radical personality change, usually after consuming large amounts of sugar, caffeine or stimulants. In "Holy Cornholio", the transformation occurs after Beavis takes many pain pills. He pulls his shirt collar over his head, raises his forearms in a right angle to his chest, and then begins to yell or scream erratically, producing a stream of gibberish and strange noises, with his eyes wide. Cornholio is a normally dormant persona (apparently the name is derived from the word "cornhole"). Cornholio tends to wander aimlessly while reciting "I am the Great Cornholio! I need TP for my bunghole!" in an odd faux-Spanish accent. Whenever someone asks him a question or challenges him in a threatening or negative manner, Cornholio will respond with "Are you threatening me?!" Sometimes Beavis will momentarily talk normally before resuming the persona of Cornholio. When he stops acting as the Cornholio persona, Beavis usually has no memory of what happened. In the guise of Cornholio, Beavis becomes a successful beat poet. In "Vaya Con Cornholio", he is deported to Mexico after wrongfully being subjected to immigration detention by an agent of the INS. During his detention the agent and his superior attempt to make sense of the gibberish, going so far as to look up the definition of "bunghole". In that same episode, he claims to be from Lake Titicaca (because of the scatological sound of its name), but when asked where it is, he responds (incorrectly) with "Nicaragua". Nicaragua may be one of the few things Beavis remembers from class lectures. Beavis's teacher, Mr. Van Driessen, refers to Nicaragua during a lecture on world economic systems in "The Great Cornholio", after which Beavis repeats the word while pacing back and forth in the classroom. Cornholio resurfaces in "Bungholio: Lord of the Harvest", in which he steals candy from everyone and Butt-Head tails him. He had stood up to Todd Ianuzzi, who demanded he move out of the road. Todd prepared to beat Beavis up in his Cornholio form with his friends. He later spares Beavis, deeming him too insane, in favor of beating up the saner Butt-Head.

Relationship with Butt-Head
Though the closest of confidants, Beavis and Butt-Head have a jaded, violent, and at times borderline sadistic relationship. Butt-Head often insults and physically abuses Beavis (usually by slapping him, sometimes accompanied by a request to "Settle down, Beavis!" if Butt-Head feels his friend is getting a bit too hyperactive, as he often does). On occasion, Beavis will fight back or stand up for himself ("Madame Blavatsky", "They're Coming to Take Me Away, Huh Huh"). His favorite means of retribution is kicking Butt-Head in the testicles. On at least one occasion, Beavis throws the first punch. In "Canoe", he initiates a fight by smacking Butt-Head across the head with a paddle (although Butt-Head goaded him into doing it). Butt-Head usually knows when Beavis is approaching his breaking point and will back off (as seen when he calls Beavis "Buttknocker" or insults Metallica one too many times). In "Choke", he specifically states that Butt-Head is "not really my friend," and in "Beavis and Butt-Head Do the Universe," Butt-Head says that Beavis is "not really my friend, he just follows me around." Nevertheless, it can be inferred that the duo are still best friends (or at least that their relationship is the only significant one for either), considering their shared activities, residence, interests, and their lack of any other friends. The two usually complement each other when one undertakes any sort of endeavor, especially if it involves their lifelong goal to "score with chicks".

Beavis is usually a follower, willingly taking Butt-Head's instructions and cooperating in his endeavors. This appears to be a byproduct of Beavis's own general witlessness rather than any fear of Butt-Head's abuseas demonstrated in the alternate reality of "It’s a Miserable Life", in which Butt-Head had never been born and Beavis was instead the dim but productive friend of younger neighbor and schoolmate Stewart Stevenson.

Relationship with other characters
Like Butt-Head, Beavis shares scorn for Stewart and Mr. Van Driessen. Though he shares Butt-Head's mutual hatred for Coach Buzzcut for the way he exploited their lack of intelligence, manliness and strength, Beavis has a little respect for him. He has shown some level of respect for Daria, as she is the only student who tolerates the duo the most without losing her cool.

Traits
While Butt-Head's main interest in life is "chicks", Beavis seems to be more interested in toilet humor and displays of violence. Beavis has a penchant for making off-beat sound effects to suit the occasion. Whenever he sees something that is sexually arousing, he imitates a spring (onomatopoetically saying "Boi-oi-oi-oi-oiiing!!!") indicating a quick erection. He sometimes makes a Bronx cheer by puckering his lips. He occasionally does impersonations, such as of Principal McVicker ("Speech Therapy"), motivational speaker Mr. Manners/Mr. Candy ("Manners Suck/Candy Sale"), and Woody Woodpecker ("Top O' the Mountain"). During one episode, Beavis conspicuously reveals that he is sometimes prone to getting erections in the company of other men and said he would have sex with a dog ( such as a beagle or Labrador ). A special ability of his is speaking backwards, as seen in "Vidiots", while the duo review a music video; however, he forgets how to do so by the end of the video. Beavis also displays a predilection for defecating and things that are related to it, and in a high-pitched tone will often enthusiastically utter the word "poop", or will say the word "plop" to indicate a bowel movement. He frequently pulls down his pants during music video reviews. He also took Kaopectate once after hearing it is for diarrhea under the misconception he would get diarrhea; he was only soothed by an enormous bowel movement which he saved in his dresser drawer, much to Butt-Head's disgust. Beavis sometimes displays savant syndrome, such as when slapped hard by Butt-Head or when attempting to pass out by holding his breath and blowing into his thumb. In this state, Beavis makes intellectual statements, usually regarding the music video he is viewing.

Beavis's parents
Beavis's family is occasionally mentioned but has never been seen in the show in person. An example is when Beavis states: "My mom's a slut... meh heh heh." According to discussion during some music video segments, Beavis's mother shares her son's peculiar hairstyle, is somewhat obese, and (most significantly) is an ignorant slut. While Beavis is conscious of his mother's promiscuity, it doesn't seem to bother him much, as he often laughs along in agreement whenever Butt-Head brings it up (in fact, when Butt-Head refers to Beavis's mother as a whore, Beavis nonchalantly says "She's not a whore, she's a slut, she doesn't charge for it"). The irony, however, is lost on Butt-Head, whose own mother's promiscuity is implied in Beavis and Butt-Head Do America. 

In Beavis and Butt-Head Do the Universe, it is revealed that Beavis' mother's name is Shirley Beavis. After the duo disappear into a black hole in 1998 and end up in the year 2022, they are told what happened to her by the real estate agent selling their house. The duo weren't paying attention to the story and were busy playing with the garbage disposal which drowned out much of the real estate agent was saying, but it can be deduced that Shirley Beavis was affected by the loss of her son and she (and possibly Butt-Head's mother) won a settlement from NASA but ended up spending it all.

In "Be All You Can Be", Butt-Head states that Beavis's father was in the Navy and told the Army recruiter that Beavis's father was "a seaman"although this could have been a joke designed to allow Butt-Head to use the word "semen".

In Beavis and Butt-Head Do America, Beavis is possibly reunited with his biological father, who seems to exhibit the same pyromania obsession as Beavis, as well as an overt physical resemblance. He is said to be a drifter and a one-time roadie for rock band Mötley Crüe. However, they remain oblivious of their father-son relationship and part ways before they make the connection.

References

Beavis and Butt-Head characters
Fictional characters from Texas
Television characters introduced in 1992
Animated characters introduced in 1992
Comedy film characters
Animated human characters
Male characters in animated series
Teenage characters in film
Teenage characters in television
Fictional cannabis users 
Fictional characters with alter egos
Fictional restaurant staff